Wilmont may refer to several location in the United States:

Wilmont, Delaware
Wilmont, Minnesota
 Wilmont Township, Nobles County, Minnesota
Wilmont, Roanoke, Virginia